Eoptolamna is an extinct genus of mackerel sharks that lived during the Cretaceous. It contains two valid species, E. eccentrolopha and E. supracretacea, which have been found in Europe and North Africa.

References

Lamniformes
Barremian life
Early Cretaceous animals of Europe
Cretaceous Spain
Fossils of Spain
Fossil taxa described in 2008
Prehistoric shark genera